Horseshoe is a shoe for horses and by analogy is applied to many things with a similar shape.

Horseshoes (game), a tossing game played with a horseshoe

Horseshoe(s) or Horse Shoe(s) may also refer to:

Places

Settlements and jurisdictions
 Horse Shoe, North Carolina, a town near a lake with the same name
 Horseshoe, Arkansas, an unincorporated community
 Horseshoe, Jersey City, a ward of Jersey City, New Jersey
 Horseshoe, Western Australia, an abandoned town
 Horseshoe Bend (disambiguation), a number of places
 Horse Shoe Curve, Virginia, an unincorporated community

Landforms and geology
 Horseshoe Bay (disambiguation), various localities
 Horseshoe Canyon (Alberta), Canada
 Horseshoe Canyon (Utah), US
 Horseshoe Harbour, Antarctica
 Horseshoe Mountain (Colorado), US
 Horseshoe Valley (disambiguation)
 The Horseshoe (Vietnam)

Facilities and structures
 Ohio Stadium or the Horseshoe, a football stadium for the Ohio State University
 The Horseshoe, a quadrangle in the Old Campus District of the University of South Carolina

Hospitality
 Binion's Horseshoe, a casino
 Horseshoe Bossier City, a casino in Louisiana
 Horseshoe Casino Baltimore, a Caesars Entertainment Casino in Maryland
 Horseshoe Hammond, a casino
 Horseshoe Indianapolis, a casino in Indianapolis
 Horseshoe Las Vegas, a casino in Las Vegas Strip
 Horseshoe St. Louis, a casino in Louisiana
 Horseshoe Casino Tunica, a casino
 Horseshoe Resort, or Horseshoe Valley Ski Club, a ski resort in southern Ontario
 Horseshoe Southern Indiana, formerly Caesars Indiana  
 Horseshoe Tavern, a bar in downtown Toronto

Animals
 Atlantic horseshoe crab, Limulus polyphemus
 Horseshoe crab, a marine arthropod
 Horseshoe bat

Arts, entertainment, and media
 Horse Shoes (1927 film), a film starring Monty Banks and Jean Arthur
 Horseshoes (1923 film), a film starring Oliver Hardy
 "Horseshoes" (song), a 2000 song by Adam Gregory
 Horseshoes (game), a tossing game played with a horseshoe
 "Horseshoe", a 2014 song by Withered Hand from New Gods

Transportation
 Horseshoe Bridge, Perth, Western Australia
 Horseshoe curve, in roads and railways
 Horseshoe Curve (Pennsylvania), a famous railroad curve
 Horseshoe route, a WWII air route 
 Horseshoe run, a 19th-century steamship route

Other uses 
 Horseshoe (symbol), "⊃", a logical connective meaning material conditional in propositional logic
 Horseshoe cloud, a meteorological phenomenon
 Horseshoe magnet
 Horseshoe map, in chaos theory
 Horseshoe moustache
 Horseshoe sandwich, an open-faced sandwich found regionally in the Midwest
 Horseshoe theory, in political science
 Horseshoe vortex, simplified model of the vortex system in the airflow around a wing
 Ʊ (minuscule: ʊ), also called horseshoe u, a letter of the International Phonetic Alphabet

See also

 
 
 
 
 
 omega ("Ω")
 upsilon ("υ")
 superset ("⊃")
 subset ("⊂")
 mho ("℧") inverse of ohm
 U (letter "u")
 Shoe (disambiguation)
 Horse (disambiguation)